Greek National Road 97 is a national highway on the island of Crete, Greece. It connects Heraklion with Agia Galini on the south coast, via Moires.

References

97
Roads in Crete